The Dakota Athletic Conference (DAC) was a college athletic conference affiliated with the National Association of Intercollegiate Athletics (NAIA).  As the name implies, member teams were located in the states of North Dakota and South Dakota.  The conference folded after the 2011–12 academic year.

History
The Dakota Athletic Conference was formed from a merger between the North Dakota College Athletic Conference (NDCAC) and the South Dakota Intercollegiate Conference (SDIC), effective the 2000-01 academic year.  Ten schools were a part of the conference in its history, consisting of the following:

 Formerly from the NDCAC: Dickinson State University, Jamestown College, the University of Mary, Mayville State University, Minot State University and Valley City State University
 Formerly from the SDIC: Black Hills State University, Dakota State University, Si Tanka University-Huron and South Dakota School of Mines and Technology

The DAC was one of the only NAIA conferences to have a television contract; America One owned the broadcast rights to the conference, although most of the games were only carried through the network's subscription service, B2 Networks.

Chronological timeline
 2000 - The Dakota Athletic Conference (DAC) was founded due to a merger of the North Dakota College Athletic Conference (NDCAC) and the South Dakota Intercollegiate Conference (SDIC). Charter members included Dickinson State University, Jamestown College, the University of Mary, Mayville State University, Minot State University and Valley City State University from the NDCAC, and Black Hills State University, Dakota State University, Si Tanka University-Huron and South Dakota School of Mines and Technology from the SDIC, effective the 2000-01 academic year.
 2005 - Si Tanka-Huron left the DAC after the school was declared to close, effective after the 2004-05 academic year.
 2006 - Mary left the DAC to join the Division II ranks of the National Collegiate Athletic Association (NCAA) as a member of the Northern Sun Intercollegiate Conference (NSIC), effective after the 2005-06 academic year.
 2011 - On July 1, 2011 Dakota State announced they were leaving the DAC to become an NAIA Independent. Additionally, member schools Black Hills State, Minot State and South Dakota Mines also left the DAC while in the process of transitioning to NCAA Division II as NCAA D-II Independents: (Black Hills State would later join the Rocky Mountain Athletic Conference (RMAC) and Minot State would later join the NSIC during the 2012-13 academic year, while South Dakota Mines would later the RMAC during the 2014-15 academic year), all effective after the 2010-11 academic year.
 2012 - The DAC would cease operations as an athletic conference, effective after the 2011-12 academic year; as many schools left to join their respective new home primary conferences: Dickinson State left for the Frontier Conference while Jamestown, Mayville State and Valley City State became NAIA independent schools (which all four of them would eventually join the North Star Athletic Association (NSAA); Jamestown, Mayville State and Valley City State as part of the charter members during the 2013-14 season alongside former DAC conference mate and NAIA Independent Dakota State; and Dickinson State during the 2014-15 season coming from the Frontier).

Member schools

Final members
The DAC ended with four full members, only one was a private school:

Former members
The DAC had six former full members, only two were private schools:

Notes

Membership timeline

Sports
Member schools fielded men's and women's teams in cross country, basketball, track and field and golf. Men's-only sports were baseball, football and wrestling, while soccer, softball and volleyball were only offered for women.

References

 
Sports leagues disestablished in 2012
College sports in South Dakota
College sports in North Dakota
2000 establishments in North Dakota
2000 establishments in South Dakota